David Pollock (born 3 February 1942) is a British humanist, and former President of the European Humanist Federation (EHF).  He is also treasurer of the Education and Health Trust Uganda.

Life and career
He became involved in 1961 with the humanist group at Oxford University, where he studied Classics.  He later worked in management in the National Coal Board, before becoming Director of Action on Smoking and Health between 1991–1995, and then of the Continence Foundation,  between 1996–2001.  His research while at ASH led to his writing "Denial & Delay: The Political History of Smoking and Health, 1951–1964" (ASH, 1999 - ).

He was a trustee of the British Humanist Association (BHA - now Humanists UK) between 1965 and 1975 (chair from 1970–72) and again from 1997 to November 2021.  He is a former board member (1979-2018; chair 1989-91) of the Rationalist Association, publisher of New Humanist magazine.

He was President of the European Humanist Federation between 2006 and 2012, where he campaigned for secularism, human rights and equality within European and international institutions.  He represented the International Humanist and Ethical Union (now Humanists International) at the Council of Europe from 2012 to 2017.  He received the Distinguished Service to Humanism Award from Humanists International in 2011.

His particular interest is in the law and religion and belief, especially the clash between laws on equality and non-discrimination and the human right to manifest a religion or belief. As EHF President he took part in the consultations of the EU-funded Religare project  and wrote a substantial paper for them  and contributed a critical review  to the book in which their report was published.  He gave evidence  to the Commission on Religion and Belief in British Public Life and was one of a group chaired by Rowan Williams convened by the Equality and Human Rights Commission that met in 2014-15 to consider the law on religion and belief and contribute thereby to the EHRC’s 2016 report "Religion or belief: is the law working?"   He addressed the International Consortium for Law and Religion Studies (ICLARS) conference in Oxford in 2016 on whether there is or should be a right to freedom from religion.  He has also written on charity law in relation to religion and belief. 

In 2021 he published privately a collection of his writing under the title "Thinking about Humanism".

References

External links 
 Personal webpage

1942 births
Living people
British humanists
Secular humanists